Sarijlu (also Romanized as Sārījlū and Sārījelow; also known as Sarīchloo, Sārī Chollū, Sārījehlū, Sarjal, and Sārjalāh) is a village in Kharqan Rural District, in the Central District of Razan County, Hamadan Province, Iran. At the 2006 census, its population was 880, in 196 families.

References 

Populated places in Razan County